Overwaitea Foods was a regional chain of supermarkets located in British Columbia, Canada.

On March 8, 1915, Robert C. Kidd purchased a store at 746 Columbia Street in New Westminster, British Columbia. He developed several innovative merchandising techniques to attract customers, including odd-penny pricing and selling 18 ounces of tea for the price of a pound.  The store was soon known as the "over-weight tea" store. When Kidd opened his second store, he called it "Overwaitea".

In 1968, Jim Pattison purchased Overwaitea. As of January 2007, the chain operated 15 outlets throughout the province, primarily in the smaller towns of British Columbia, while a number of stores formerly operated under the Overwaitea brand have since been converted to that of its sister chain, Save-On-Foods.  Their parent company, the Overwaitea Food Group, also owns Urban Fare, PriceSmart Foods and Cooper's Foods.  All are owned by the Jim Pattison Group.

On March 22, 2018, the remaining two Overwaitea locations in British Columbia were closed, reopening the following day as Save-On-Foods stores.

See also
List of Canadian supermarkets

References 

Supermarkets of Canada
Jim Pattison Group
Retail companies established in 1915
Retail companies disestablished in 2018
1915 establishments in British Columbia
2018 disestablishments in British Columbia
Canadian companies established in 1915
Canadian companies disestablished in 2018

Food and drink companies based in British Columbia